General Lord George Henry Lennox (29 November 1737 – 25 March 1805) was a British Army officer and politician who sat in the House of Commons from 1761 to 1790.

Early life
He was the second son of Charles Lennox, 2nd Duke of Richmond, and was a great-grandson of King Charles II of England. He was a brother of the famous Lennox sisters.

Military career
On 17 December 1751, Lennox was commissioned an ensign in the 2nd Regiment of Foot Guards. He was promoted to be captain of a company in the 25th Regiment of Foot on 23 March 1756. From 1758 to 1762 George Lennox was the Colonel of the 33rd Regiment of Foot. In 1757 a second battalion (2nd/33rd) of the 33rd Regiment had been raised. In 1758, this battalion became an independent regiment, the 72nd Regiment of Foot. At that time, his elder brother Charles Lennox had been the Colonel of the 33rd and was then appointed Colonel of the new regiment. George Lennox took command of the 33rd Regiment (1st/33rd). At the beginning of May 1758 the 33rd Regiment was stationed in Blandford, Dorset and was then moved to the Isle of Wight to take part in an attack on the French coast at St Malo on 5 May in the Seven Years' War. 

On 1 August, both Brothers Regiments (33rd & 72nd) were involved in a highly successful raid on Cherbourg, which resulted in the destruction of 30 French ships, and the capture of 200 guns and rockets, plus a number of French Regimental Colours and a large quantity of booty. After this raid George Lennox and the 33rd Regiment remained inactive, garrisoned on the Isle of Wight on internal security duties.
 
On 29 December 1762, he was appointed Colonel of the 25th Regiment of Foot, which he commanded until his death. On 16 February 1784, he was appointed Constable of the Tower of London.

Parliamentary career
He was the Member of Parliament for Chichester from 1761 to 1767 and for Sussex from 1767 to 1790. He was succeeded in the latter seat by his son. He was appointed a member of the  Privy Council in 1784.

Later life
In 1772, he was elected Mayor of Chichester.

Family

Lord George Lennox married Lady Louisa Kerr, daughter of William Kerr, 4th Marquess of Lothian in 1759, and they had four children:
 Lady Maria Louisa Lennox (2 November 1760 – July 1843).
 Lady Emily Charlotte Lennox (December 1763 – 19 October 1832), married Adm. Hon. Sir George Cranfield Berkeley and had issue.
 Charles Lennox, 4th Duke of Richmond (9 September 1764 – 28 August 1819).
 Lady Georgiana Lennox (6 December 1765 – 20 January 1841), married Henry Bathurst, 3rd Earl Bathurst.

Despite the Hanoverian side taken by his father, George made an arranged marriage for his own son Charles with the heiress of Clan Gordon, a notable Jacobite family.

Ancestry

References

External links
thePeerage.com

1737 births
1805 deaths
Younger sons of dukes
Members of the Parliament of Great Britain for English constituencies
British MPs 1761–1768
British MPs 1768–1774
British MPs 1774–1780
British MPs 1780–1784
British MPs 1784–1790
British Army generals
33rd Regiment of Foot officers
Lord-Lieutenants of the Tower Hamlets
Constables of the Tower of London
King's Own Scottish Borderers officers
Mayors of Chichester
Members of the Privy Council of Great Britain
Coldstream Guards officers
Non-inheriting heirs presumptive